Josaia is a given name. Notable people with the name include:

Josaia Raisuqe (born 1994), Fijian rugby union footballer
Josaia Rayawa, Fijian chief, religious leader, and politician
Josaia Tavaiqia (1931–1997), Fijian chief and politician
Josaia Waqabaca, Fijian politician

See also
Josiah (given name)